The  Denver Broncos season was the team's 31st year in professional football and its 21st with the National Football League (NFL). After reaching Super Bowl XXIV, the Broncos struggled and finished with their worst post-merger record in a 16-game season, 5-11. This mark would be eclipsed by the 2010 edition of the team, which finished 4-12.

Off Season

NFL Draft

Personnel

Staff

Roster

Regular season

Schedule

Game summaries

Week 2 vs Chiefs

Steve Atwater hit on Christian Okoye

Week 12 at Lions

Week 14 at Chiefs

Standings

References

External links
Denver Broncos – 1990 media guide
 1990 Denver Broncos at Pro-Football-Reference.com

Denver Broncos
Denver Broncos seasons
Bronco